Braxton Harris (born 1983/1984) is an American football coach and former player who is currently the head coach for the Houston Christian Huskies of the Southland Conference (SLC). He played as a quarterback at Mary Hardin–Baylor and later served as a coach there, at Waco High School, Texas Lutheran, Howard Payne and Campbell before receiving the head job at Houston Christian in 2023.

Early life and education
Born in 1983/1984, Harris attended Mexia High School where he was an all-district quarterback and led his team to the regional semifinals as a junior. At Mexia, he played under his father Craig, who was the head coach. Harris played college football for the Mary Hardin–Baylor Crusaders from 2003 to 2005, being a member of their 2004 national championship finalist team. He graduated from the school in 2008 with a bachelor of science degree in education, later receiving a master's degree in education administration the following year.

Coaching career
After serving 2006 as a student assistant at Mary Hardin–Baylor, Harris became the wide receivers coach and recruiting coordinator for the team in 2007, where he served through 2009. He helped them win the conference championship four times, and reach as far as the NCAA Division III quarterfinals in 2006. He left to become the safeties coach at Waco High School in 2010, serving in that position for only one season.

Harris began coaching at the Division III school Texas Lutheran in 2011, spending his first season as defensive ends coach and recruiting coordinator. The next season, he remained recruiting coordinator but switched to linebackers coach. He began serving as assistant head coach, special teams coordinator, and co-defensive coordinator in 2013, while retaining his roles as recruiting coordinator and linebackers coach. Harris helped them win the conference championship in 2013, while coaching a defense that contributed to Texas Lutheran's placement of sixth nationally in the category of turnover margin.

Harris became head coach of the Howard Payne Yellow Jackets in 2017, and posted a record of 1–9 in his first year, while the team allowed an average of 56 points per game. The Yellow Jackets again won only one game in 2018, but the following season Harris led them to a 5–5 mark, the best record the team had posted since 2006. He announced his resignation in December 2020, after three years with the school, prior to their postponed 2020–21 season. Harris compiled an overall record of 7–23 at Howard Payne.

In 2021, Harris began serving as linebackers coach and recruiting coordinator for the Division I FCS Campbell Fighting Camels. He added the position of assistant head coach in his second season. After the 2022 season, he was named the head coach of the Houston Christian Huskies.

Head coaching record

References

External links
 Houston Christian profile

1980s births
Living people
American football quarterbacks
Campbell Fighting Camels football coaches
Houston Christian Huskies football coaches
Howard Payne Yellow Jackets football coaches
Mary Hardin–Baylor Crusaders football coaches
Mary Hardin–Baylor Crusaders football players
Texas Lutheran Bulldogs football coaches
High school football coaches in Texas
People from Mexia, Texas
Coaches of American football from Texas
Players of American football from Texas